Moravian-Silesian Foothills are foothills and a geomorphological mesoregion of the Czech Republic.

Geomorphology
The region represents the westernmost section of the Western Beskidian Foothills macroregion within the Outer Western Carpathians subprovince. The territory has an elongated shape, stretching from west to east. It is bordered by the Moravian-Silesian Beskids and Hostýn-Vsetín Mountains on the south and by the Moravian Gate on the north.

Location
Moravian-Silesian Foothills are located in eastern Czech Republic. Most of the foothills lie in the Moravian-Silesian Region, about one third lies in the Olomouc Region, and a small south-western part extends into the Zlín Region.

Cities and towns
The most populated settlements which lies entirely in the territory are Třinec, Český Těšín, Nový Jičín and Kopřivnice. The cities of Frýdek-Místek and Přerov and the town of Valašské Meziříčí are also partly located there.

See also
Silesian Foothills

Geography of the Moravian-Silesian Region
Geography of the Olomouc Region